The  New York Giants season was the franchise's 19th season in the National Football League.

Schedule

Game Summaries

Week Four: at Phil-Pitt "Steagles"

Week Five: at Brooklyn Dodgers

Week Six: vs. Phil-Pitt "Steagles"

Week Seven: vs. Green Bay Packers

Week Eight: at Detroit Lions

Note: As of the end of the 2019 NFL season, this is the most recent 0–0 tie in NFL history.

Week Nine: vs. Chicago Bears

Week Ten: vs. Chicago Cardinals

Week Eleven: vs. Brooklyn Dodgers

Week Twelve: vs. Washington Redskins

Week Thirteen: at Washington Redskins

Playoffs

1943 Eastern Division Playoff: vs. Washington Redskins

Standings

See also
List of New York Giants seasons

References

1943 New York Giants Season at Pro-Football-Reference

New York Giants seasons
New York Giants
New York
1940s in Manhattan
Washington Heights, Manhattan s